Tropical Storm Laura was the final storm in the active 1971 Atlantic hurricane season. The resulting flooding killed one person and caused crop damage. 26,000 people were forced to evacuate their homes. Initially, Laura was forecast to move across the island and impact the southern United States, but it executed a small loop and turned to the southwest. The storm moved ashore on Belize, one of only four November storms to affect the country. Little impact occurred during Laura's final landfall, and it dissipated on November 22 over central Guatemala.

Meteorological history

Tropical Storm Laura began in a large area of convection across the southwest Caribbean Sea in mid-November. It moved northwestward, slowly organizing and becoming a tropical storm on November 14. Originally, the National Hurricane Center anticipated Laura would attain hurricane status, as well as for it to continue northward into the Gulf of Mexico. Although a cold front was expected to bring the storm to the north, a ridge instead increased over the southeastern United States, which prevented Laura from moving ashore.

Steering currents were initially weak, which caused the storm to drift toward the northeast, before the ridge to its north forced the storm to the southwest; by late on November 17, Laura finished executing a clockwise loop. Its path to the southwest away from Cuba was unusual; only two other storms on record – a hurricane in 1888 and Hurricane Ike in 2008 – had a southward element in their path when they affected Cuba, and each struck the northern coast of the country. Laura weakened as it turned westward and later to the south and southwest. Early on November 22, the system dissipated over central Guatemala.

Preparations and impact

On the mainland, the storm destroyed 20 homes and several tobacco sheds, with damage also reported to the coffee, sugar, fruit, and vegetable crops. Due to the flooding, officials forced 26,000 people from their homes in Pinar del Río, and one person in that province drowned while crossing a river. The storm's passage was believed to have diverted a flock of great black-backed gulls toward Central America and north-coastal South America; the species is usually found in the Mid-Atlantic states, and were migrating to the Gulf Coast or Cuba when they were affected by the storm.

When Laura's path was uncertain, forecasters advised fishermen to remain at port along the Yucatan Peninsula and southern Florida. Gale warnings were also issued for the Florida Keys, due to the uncertainty. No significant damage or casualties were reported in Central America, although heavy rainfall was reported across the region. On Glover's Reef off the coast of British Honduras (now Belize), the storm stranded a group of about 20 scientists affiliated with the Smithsonian Institution; the group was affected by the strong winds and rains, and required rescue. The storm damaged several buildings along the mainland.

Laura was one of only four storms to form in November and affect Belize, the others being a tropical storm in 1898, a hurricane in 1942, and Hurricane Ida in 2009.

See also

Other storms of the same name

References

External links
National Hurricane Center
Monthly Weather Review for 1971

1971 Atlantic hurricane season
Hurricanes in Cuba
Laura 1971
Atlantic tropical storms